In mathematics, a primefree sequence is a sequence of integers that does not contain any prime numbers. More specifically, it usually means a sequence defined by the same recurrence relation as the Fibonacci numbers, but with different initial conditions causing all members of the sequence to be composite numbers that do not all have a common divisor. To put it algebraically, a sequence of this type is defined by an appropriate choice of two composite numbers a1 and a2, such that the greatest common divisor  is equal to 1, and such that for  there are no primes in the sequence of numbers calculated from the formula
.
The first primefree sequence of this type was published by Ronald Graham in 1964.

Wilf's sequence
A primefree sequence found by Herbert Wilf has initial terms 

 
The proof that every term of this sequence is composite relies on the periodicity of Fibonacci-like number sequences modulo the members of a finite set of primes. For each prime , the positions in the sequence where the numbers are divisible by  repeat in a periodic pattern, and different primes in the set have overlapping patterns that result in a covering set for the whole sequence.

Nontriviality
The requirement that the initial terms of a primefree sequence be coprime is necessary for the question to be non-trivial. In this case, all the numbers in the sequence will be composite, but for a trivial reason.

The order of the initial terms is also important. In Paul Hoffman's biography of Paul Erdős, The man who loved only numbers, the Wilf sequence is cited but with the initial terms switched. The resulting sequence appears primefree for the first hundred terms or so, but term 138 is the 45-digit prime .

Other sequences
Several other primefree sequences are known:
 (sequence A083104 in the OEIS; Graham 1964),
 (sequence A083105 in the OEIS; Knuth 1990), and
 (sequence A082411 in  the OEIS; Nicol 1999).
The sequence of this type with the smallest known initial terms has
 (sequence A221286 in the OEIS; Vsemirnov 2004).

Notes

References

External links 
Problem 31.  Fibonacci- all composites sequence. The prime puzzles and problems connection.

Integer sequences
Number theory
Recurrence relations